The Struggle Companies (Saraya al-Sira) was  5,000-strong commando force deployed around Damascus. Created in 1973 and commanded by Maj. Gen Adnan Assad, a cousin of the late Syrian president, Hafez Assad. The all Alawite Struggle Companies are broadly similar to the Defense Companies and are/were fanatically loyal to the Syrian government and were heavily used during the 1982 Hama Muslim Brotherhood uprising

The Syrian president exercises direct control over the Saraya al-Sira', Saraya al-Difa', and the Republican Guard all of whom function as a Praetorian Guard. The headquarters of the Saraya al-Sira' is Mezzeh Military Airport

The Saraya al-Sira' wore combat uniforms quite distinct from the regular Syrian military, their uniform consisted of lizard-patterned camouflage fatigues along with Soviet combat boots, helmets and bulletproof vests. Headgear consisted of a red or orange beret.

See also
 Defense Companies (Syria)
 Shabiha

References

Sources
 Arabs at War: Military Effectiveness 1948-91, Kenneth M. Pollack, University of Nebraska Press, Lincoln and London, 2002, and Pollack's book reviewed in International Security, Vol. 28, No. 2
 Arab Armies of the Middle East Wars (Men-at-Arms, 194) by Samuel Katz, Osprey Publishing 1988, 
 Armies in Lebanon 1982 to 1984 (Men at Arms Series, 165) by Samuel Katz and Ronald Volstad, Osprey Publishing 1985,

External links
 LOC country study

Military units and formations established in 1973
Special forces of Syria